Halfan Hythani Hamza (born March 15, 1995) known by the ring names Hassan Mwakinyo and Tornado is a Tanzanian professional boxer. He held the WBF Intercontinental light-middleweight title twice in 2020 until he was stripped from the title. He previously held the UBO International super light-middleweight title in 2018.

Professional career
Mwakinyo made his professional boxing debut at the age of 20 against Alibaba R Tarimo on November 29, 2015. He has since recorded a total of 23 fights in which he won 20 fights and lost 3, without a draw. He has won several titles including;

Tanzania super welterweight in 2016,
East and Central Africa super welterweight in 2017
WBA Pan Africa super welterweight in 2017
UBO International super welterweight title in 2018
WBF Intercontinental super welterweight in 2020 
ABU super welterweight title in 2021.

In 2022, Mwakinyo was banned by the British Boxing Board of Control (BBBC) two weeks after a defeat  from the British Boxer Liam Smith without disclosing the reason behind banning of the Tanzanian boxer.

Professional boxing record

References

External links

Tanzanian male boxers
Light-middleweight boxers
1995 births
Living people